Taylor H. Sanford (November 11, 1908 – August 8, 1966) was an American baseball player, coach, and college athletics administrator.  He served as the head baseball coach at Randolph–Macon College from 1942 to 1949 and at Wake Forest University from 1951 to 1955.    He led the Wake Forest Demon Deacons baseball team to the 1955 College World Series championship.

Early life
Sanford was born to Dr. and Mrs. T. Ryland Sanford in Hampton, Virginia.  He later attended Hargrave Military Academy where he was an all-state athlete in football, basketball and baseball.  He then enrolled at the University of Richmond.

Playing career
Sanford was captain of the Richmond Spiders football, basketball, and baseball teams, and set school records in the shot put and discus.  He then played baseball professionally in the Bi-State and Piedmont leagues while also coaching prep and college teams.  He ended his professional career in 1946, having never climbed higher than Class B.

He was listed as a scout for the New York Yankees of Major League Baseball in 1948.

Coaching career
Sanford began his coaching career at Hargrave, coaching for thirteen years at the prep school.  He became athletic director and coach of the baseball and basketball teams at Randolph–Macon.  His teams won a total of five conference championships over his seven years in Ashland, Virginia, before moving to Wake Forest as freshman football coach.  In his second year at Wake Forest, he added baseball to his coaching duties while continuing in various assistant coaching roles with the football team.  Most notably, the Deacs won the Atlantic Coast Conference and College World Series in 1955. During 1955, the U. S. Olympic Committee asked coach Sanford to put together a team to compete in the Pan American Games in Buenos Aires, Argentina.  Because of the time of year of the games, the team Sanford put together was mostly his Wake Forest college team.  This was the first time baseball had been played in any part of Olympic competition, and the U. S. team took the silver medal.

During the College World Series, a rainout forced a game on Sunday, sparking a small controversy at the Baptist school when word reached Wake Forest.  This followed word that Sanford would not be kept full-time after the 1956 season and little recognition from the school of his achievement in Omaha.  Sanford therefore resigned from Wake Forest on January 31, 1956, citing his "feeling of insecurity" and that he had "no assurance that I will have a job after the current season is over."

Later life and death
Sanford returned to Virginia after stepping down at Wake Forest, and served as athletic director at Fort Lee. He died on August 8, 1966, in Petersburg, Virginia. In 1977, Sanford was inducted into the Virginia Sports Hall of Fame.

Head coaching record

References

External links

1908 births
1966 deaths
American men's basketball players
Baseball coaches from Virginia
Baseball first basemen
Baseball players from Virginia
Basketball coaches from Virginia
Basketball players from Virginia
College men's track and field athletes in the United States
Danville Leafs players
Danville-Scholfield Leafs players
Hargrave Military Academy alumni
High school baseball coaches in the United States
Mayodan Millers players
Minor league baseball managers
New York Yankees scouts
Randolph–Macon Yellow Jackets athletic directors
Randolph–Macon Yellow Jackets baseball coaches
Randolph–Macon Yellow Jackets football coaches
Randolph–Macon Yellow Jackets men's basketball coaches
Richmond Colts players
Richmond Spiders baseball players
Richmond Spiders football players
Richmond Spiders men's basketball players
Rocky Mount Red Sox players
Sportspeople from Petersburg, Virginia
Wake Forest Demon Deacons baseball coaches
Wake Forest Demon Deacons football coaches
Wilson Tobs players